The 2025 New Jersey gubernatorial election is scheduled to take place on November 4, 2025, to elect the governor of New Jersey. Incumbent Democratic Governor Phil Murphy is term-limited and ineligible to seek a third consecutive term. Jack Ciattarelli, the Republican nominee for Governor in 2021, has stated he intends to run again.

Democratic primary

Candidates

Declared
 Stephen Sweeney, former President of the New Jersey Senate (2010–2022) from the 3rd district (2002–2022)

Publicly expressed interest
 Ras Baraka, Mayor of Newark (2014–present)
 Steven Fulop, Mayor of Jersey City (2013–present)

Potential
 Craig Coughlin, Speaker of the New Jersey General Assembly (2018–present) from the 19th district (2010–present)
 Christopher Durkin, Essex County Clerk (2006–present)
 Vin Gopal, state senator from the 11th district (2018–present)
 Sheila Oliver, Lieutenant Governor of New Jersey (2018–present), former Speaker of the New Jersey General Assembly (2010–2014) from the 34th district (2004–2018), and candidate for U.S. Senate in 2013
 Andre Sayegh, mayor of Paterson (2018–present)
 Sean Spiller, mayor of Montclair (2020–present)
 John Wisniewski, former state assemblyman from the 19th district (1996–2018), former Chair of the New Jersey Democratic State Committee, and candidate for governor in 2017

Declined
 Cory Booker, U.S. Senator (2013–present) and candidate for President of the United States in 2020

Endorsements

Republican primary

Candidates

Declared
Jack Ciattarelli, former state assemblyman from the 16th district (2011–2018), nominee for governor in 2021 and candidate in 2017

Publicly expressed interest
 Jon Bramnick, state senator (2022–present) and former Minority Leader of the New Jersey General Assembly (2012–2022) from the 21st district (2003–2022)

Potential
 Shaun Golden, Monmouth County Sheriff (2011–present) and chair of the Monmouth County Republican Committee (2014–present)
 Declan O'Scanlon, state senator (2018–present)
 Mehmet Oz, cardiologist, former host of The Dr. Oz Show, and nominee for U.S. Senate in Pennsylvania in 2022
 Holly Schepisi, state senator from the 39th district (2021–present)
 Mike Testa, state senator from the 1st district (2019–present) and chair of the Cumberland County Republican Committee (2014–present)

Notes

References

New Jersey gubernatorial elections
New Jersey
Gubernatorial